María José de Pablo Fernández, known professionally as Cote de Pablo (born November 12, 1979), is a Chilean-American actress and singer. Born in Santiago, Chile, she moved to the United States at the age of ten, where she studied acting.

De Pablo co-hosted episodes of the Latin-American talk show Control with former Entertainment Tonight host Carlos Ponce at the age of 15 before attending Carnegie Mellon University to study music and theatre. After appearing in a number of television roles, she was cast to portray main character Ziva David in the CBS television series NCIS in 2005 and won an ALMA Award for the role in 2011.

She performed a portion of Tom Waits' song "Temptation" for a 2008 episode of NCIS. Outside the series, she has sung on Roberto Pitre's Vivo En Vida CD.

Early life
Cote was born in Santiago, Chile, to Francisco de Pablo and María Olga Fernández. She has a younger sister, Andrea, and a brother, Francisco, who works as a DJ. When de Pablo was 10 years old, her mother, María Olga Fernández, took a job in Miami, Florida, at a Spanish-language television network. While there, de Pablo attended Arvida Middle School and New World School of the Arts, where she studied musical theatre. In the fifth grade, she found many people could not pronounce her first name of "María José", so she asked them to call her "Coté", a common Chilean nickname for María José. De Pablo attended Carnegie Mellon University in Pittsburgh, Pennsylvania, where she studied music and theater and appeared in several plays, including And the World Goes 'Round, The House of Bernarda Alba, Indiscretions, The Fantasticks, and A Little Night Music. She graduated in 2000 with a Bachelor of Fine Arts in Musical Theater.

Acting career

Early roles
De Pablo began working in the entertainment industry at age 15, when she hosted some episodes of the talk show Control (1994–95) on Univision, alongside former Entertainment Tonight host Carlos Ponce.

After graduation, she moved to New York City to find work as an actress, working as a waitress in an Indian restaurant in Manhattan and an Italian eatery in Brooklyn to support herself. In 2000, she had roles in Fox's The $treet and the CBS-drama The Education of Max Bickford. She picked up parts in the New York City Public Theater, on the TV show All My Children, and in commercials. De Pablo played the role of Marguerite Cisneros in The Jury (broadcast on the Fox Network). The show was short-lived, screening only 10 one-hour episodes. In 2005, De Pablo was about to make her Broadway debut in The Mambo Kings as Dolores Fuentes, but the show closed after a short trial run in San Francisco.

NCIS

De Pablo is primarily known for her portrayal of Ziva David, an Israeli Mossad officer turned NCIS agent, in the police procedural drama NCIS.  She had submitted a videotape audition while waiting for The Mambo Kings to move forward and was asked to fly to Los Angeles for a screen test two days after it was canceled. Network executives arranged for her to act alongside series regular Michael Weatherly to test for chemistry during her second audition; he went off script by brushing her hair back and commenting, "You remind me of Salma Hayek". De Pablo's response to Weatherly was to stay in character and she "dismissed him completely". Afterward, producer Donald P. Bellisario met with her as she was waiting for a cab to take her back to the airport, telling her she had landed the part.

De Pablo described the character as "someone completely different from anyone else on the show because she's been around men all her life; she's used to men of authority. She's not afraid of men."

In 2006, she won an Imagen Award at the Imagen Foundation Awards for Best Supporting Actress in Television for NCIS. In 2008 and 2009, she was nominated for the same award.  Also in 2008 and 2009, she was nominated for an ALMA Award for Outstanding Actress in a Drama Television Series. In 2011, de Pablo was nominated once again for an Imagen Award, but this time it was for Best Actress in Television, not Supporting Actress. She won the 2011 ALMA Award for Favorite Television Actress—Leading Role in Drama.

On July 10, 2013, it was reported by CBS that de Pablo would be leaving NCIS for undisclosed reasons, although she remained long enough to conclude her character Ziva David's storyline at the beginning of season 11. Later, in a 2016 Q&A session, de Pablo stated that part of the reason why she left the show was because of the direction of her character's arc and feeling that the scripts were not good enough to make her stay.

De Pablo later told Cindy Elavsky that Ziva could come back because she did not die. However, in the season 13 finale of the series, it was stated that her character had apparently died in an explosion in Israel. 

Three years later in 2019, season 16 episode 'She', revealed that Ziva is alive and has gone into hiding off-screen. De Pablo made a surprise unannounced return to the show in the last scene of the season 16 finale, which aired on May 21, 2019, in which Ziva arrives at Gibbs' basement to warn him that his life is in danger. Producers confirmed that de Pablo would appear in the first two episodes of the show's 17th season and then in the season's tenth and eleventh episodes as part of her storyline.

After NCIS
In 2014 de Pablo was cast in the film The 33, about the 2010 Copiapó mining accident, as the wife of one of the miners. She was also cast in the 2015 CBS miniseries The Dovekeepers, based on the Alice Hoffman novel. In March 2016, Deadline Hollywood reported de Pablo is slated to return to series television as Laura Kale in Syfy's thriller-drama, Prototype, pending negotiations. In April 2016, TVLine columnist Matt Mitovich confirmed de Pablo's return to series television. The show was to feature "three unlikely colleagues—two of them played by de Pablo and Jack Davenport—who inadvertently stumble upon an invention that challenges the very nature of quantum physics—a discovery which in turn puts their lives in grave danger." In August 2016, Deadline reported that Syfy passed on the show.

On August 28, 2018 Deadline announced that de Pablo and former NCIS castmate Michael Weatherly would be the executive producers of the upcoming CBS detective drama MIA, written by Shepard Boucher.

Music
De Pablo performed a portion of Tom Waits' song "Temptation" on the NCIS episode "Last Man Standing", which first aired in the US on September 23, 2008. Her full performance of the song, including some lyrics in French, appears on NCIS: The Official TV Soundtrack, which was released on February 10, 2009.

She is the singer in Roberto Pitre's Vivo en vida where she sings "Samba in Prelude" and "Cry Me a River". De Pablo was also featured on The 33's official soundtrack, singing "Gracias a la Vida".

Personal life
De Pablo was in a long-term relationship with actor Diego Serrano, but they were reported to have separated in June 2015.

Filmography

Notes

Awards and nominations

References

External links

 
 
 What Is Cote de Pablo Doing Today

1979 births
21st-century American actresses
Actresses from Miami
American television actresses
Carnegie Mellon University College of Fine Arts alumni
Chilean television actresses
Chilean emigrants to the United States
Hispanic and Latino American actresses
Living people
People from Santiago